Ki-Jana Delano Hoever (born 18 January 2002) is a Dutch professional footballer who plays as a defender for Stoke City on loan from Premier League club Wolverhampton Wanderers. Hoever is a Liverpool youth academy graduate, but limited appearances brought him to join Wolverhampton Wanderers in 2020.

Early years
Hoever was born in Amsterdam, Netherlands and is of Surinamese descent. His father, a former American football player, named him after former NFL running back Ki-Jana Carter.

Youth career
Hoever started out in the youth ranks at AZ Alkmaar before moving on to Ajax in 2014. Hoever played 13 times and scored two goals in the Under-17 Eredivisie during the 2017–18 season. Described as equally as comfortable playing at centre-half and right-back, Hoever completed his move to Liverpool in August 2018 from Ajax but had to wait until September 2018 for international clearance. As he had not signed a professional contract, Liverpool only had to pay a minimal compensation and Ajax were reported to be bitterly disappointed to lose the player. Manchester City, Manchester United and Chelsea were also reportedly interested in making the signing. Hoever made his first Liverpool appearance in a 4–1 win for the under-18s against Newcastle on 15 September. Following that he was given a substitute appearance in the Reds' UEFA Youth League match at home to Paris Saint-Germain that ended in a 5–2 win on 18 September 2018. He later played the full 90 minutes at centre-half in the 5–0 win over Napoli that sealed Liverpool's U18s place in the knockout stages of that tournament.

By November 2018, Hoever had his U23s debut as a wide right midfielder against league leaders Everton at Goodison Park, which Liverpool won. His performance earned praise from U23 manager Neil Critchley, who said, “I thought his calmness and assurance, his decision-making, his intelligence without the ball, it was terrific. I was very impressed with him indeed.” Hoever made further appearances at right-back for the U23s including receiving plaudits for his performance in a 4–1 win against the reigning Premier League 2 champions Arsenal.

Professional career

Liverpool
In December 2018 Hoever began training with the Liverpool first team, with manager Jürgen Klopp describing him as "confident" and "a joy to watch." Hoever was given the squad number 51 ahead of the FA Cup game against Wolverhampton Wanderers at Molineux Stadium on 7 January 2019. He started the match on the bench, but replaced an injured Dejan Lovren at centre-back in the opening minutes. Hoever's appearance made him the youngest ever Liverpool player in the FA Cup and their third youngest in any competition.

He signed a long-term professional contract with the club on 31 July 2019.

His first professional goal came on 25 September 2019 in an EFL Cup match against Milton Keynes Dons. Upon scoring, at the age of 17 years, eight months and 10 days, Hoever became the fourth-youngest player to find the back of the net for Liverpool, behind Ben Woodburn, Michael Owen and Jordan Rossiter.

Wolverhampton Wanderers
On 19 September 2020, Hoever completed a £9 million transfer to Wolverhampton Wanderers. Hoever made his first appearance in the Premier League, and his debut for Wolves, as a second-half substitute in a 4–0 defeat away to West Ham United on 27 September 2020. He made his debut Molineux appearance for Wolves in the team's next match, a 1–0 victory in the Premier League over Fulham on 4 October 2020, also as a second-half substitute.

Hoever made his full Premier League debut away to Manchester United on 29 December 2020, a game which Wolves lost narrowly to a  deflection in added time.

Loan to PSV
On 23 June 2022, Hoever joined PSV on a season-long loan.

Loan to Stoke City
On 27 January 2023, Hoever joined Championship club Stoke City on loan until the end of the season. On 10 March 2023 he scored his first goals for the club, netting twice in a 3-2 home victory over Blackburn Rovers.

International career
Born in the Netherlands, Hoever is of Surinamese descent. Hoever is a Netherlands U17 international, scoring three goals in his first five games. He participated in the U17 European Championships in Ireland in 2019, a tournament which the Netherlands won. Hoever started as the Netherlands beat Italy in the final with a scoreline of 4–2, a game which saw Hoever hit the post from a free-kick, which provided the assist for the Dutch's second goal.

Career statistics

Honours
Liverpool
UEFA Super Cup: 2019
FIFA Club World Cup: 2019

PSV
Johan Cruyff Shield: 2022

Netherlands U17
UEFA European Under-17 Championship: 2019

Individual
UEFA European Under-17 Championship Team of the Tournament: 2019

References

2002 births
Living people
Footballers from Amsterdam
Dutch footballers
Netherlands youth international footballers
Dutch sportspeople of Surinamese descent
Liverpool F.C. players
Association football defenders
Dutch expatriate footballers
Expatriate footballers in England
Dutch expatriate sportspeople in England
Wolverhampton Wanderers F.C. players
AZ Alkmaar players
AFC Ajax players
PSV Eindhoven players
Stoke City F.C. players
Premier League players
Eredivisie players
Jong PSV players
Eerste Divisie players